The Ventura County Historic Landmarks & Points of Interest consist of buildings, sites, and neighborhoods designated by Ventura County Cultural Heritage Board as historic landmarks and points of interest in Ventura County, California. The county board of supervisors created the Cultural Heritage Board in 1966 and in August 1968, two sites were designated: the Faulkner House (VCHL No. 1) near Santa Paula; and the Edwards Adobe in Saticoy (VCHL No. 2). The scope was established to include the entire county: both cities and the unincorporated areas. The cities of Fillmore, Oxnard, Port Hueneme, Simi Valley, and Thousand Oaks have the county Cultural Heritage Board advise them and those designations are listed here. The cities of Moorpark, Ojai, Santa Paula, and Ventura established their own separate historic designation systems with the City of Ventura Historic Landmarks and Districts developing into an extensive list. The Port Hueneme Historical Society Museum houses historical artifacts, photographs and information on the history of the Hueneme area. The museum is in the Hueneme Bank Building (VCHL No. 32).

Ventura County Historic Landmarks

Ventura County Points of Interest

See also
 National Register of Historic Places listings in Ventura County, California
 California Historical Landmarks in Ventura County, California
 City of Ventura Historic Landmarks and Districts

References

 

Heritage registers in California
Lists of places in California
Landmarks in California
Locally designated landmarks in the United States